Stanek may refer to:

Stanek, a Polish-language surname
Staněk, a Czech-language surname

Stanek, Podlaskie Voivodeship (north-east Poland)
Stanek, Opole Voivodeship (south-west Poland)